The Wandering Swordsman is a 1970 Hong Kong wuxia film directed by Chang Cheh and produced by the Shaw Brothers Studio, starring David Chiang and Lily Li.

Plot
The wandering swordsman Yu Hsieh Erh travels around seeking adventure and meets a group of bandits who are planning to rob a convoy escorting some valuables. Initially, he is tricked by them into participating in the robbery but then realises his folly and he returns to take his revenge on them.

Cast
David Chiang as Wandering Swordsman
Lily Li as Jiang Ning / Siao Ning Ji
Cheng Lui as Chief Jiang Wei
Cheung Pooi-saan as "Fail Safe" Kung Wu
Wang Kuang-yu as Single Swordsman Jin Li Loi
Wu Ma as Foxy Hou Jiou
Chan Sing as Iron King Jung Sz Hu
Lau Gong as Flying Robber Fang Tien Lung
Hung Lau as Flying Robber Guo Tien Wan
Bolo Yeung as Unicorn
Tung Li as Chief Huang
Nam Wai-lit as Chief Wen
Tung Choi-bo as Chief Xie
Lau Kwan as casino gambler
Wong Pau-gei as Brother Choy
Wong Chung as Wei Sheng Security member
Cliff Lok as Wei Sheng Security member
Yuen Cheung-yan as Wei Sheng Security member
Yuen Shun-yi as Wei Sheng Security member / robber
Hsu Hsia as Wei Sheng Security member
Chan Siu-gai as Wei Sheng Security member
Yee Kwan as casino dealer
Wu Por as casino cashier
Chui Chung-hok as casino thug
Chan Keung as casino thug
Fuk Yan-cheng as casino gambler
Yue Man-wa as casino gambler
Chan Chuen as robber
Yuen Woo-ping as robber
Lo Wai as robber
Yen Shi-kwan as robber
Fung Hap-so as robber
Chan Seng-tong as robber
Lai Yan as robber
Wong Ching as robber
Tam Bo as robber
Ko Hung as robber
Ng Yuen-fan as Unicorn Clan member / robber
Wong Mei as Unicorn Clan member
Chin Chun as restaurant boss
Lok Ming as restaurant waiter
Lau Cheun as restaurant patron
Tsang Choh-lam as eatery waiter
Goo Chim-hung as eatery boss
Kwan Yan as eatery customer
Hao Li-jen as villager fleeing flood
Lau Kar-wing
San Sin
Kong Chuen
Wan Leng-gwong
Fan Dan

External links

The Wandering Swordsman at Hong Kong Cinemagic

1970 films
1970s action films
1970s martial arts films
Films directed by Chang Cheh
Hong Kong martial arts films
Shaw Brothers Studio films
Wuxia films
1970s Mandarin-language films
1970s Hong Kong films